Rhodellophyceae is a grouping of red algae.

References

Red algae classes